Stephen C. Meyer (born 1958) is an American author and former educator. He is an advocate of the  pseudoscience  of intelligent design and helped found the Center for Science and Culture (CSC) of the Discovery Institute (DI), which is the main organization behind the intelligent design movement.  Before joining the DI, Meyer was a professor at Whitworth College. Meyer is a senior fellow of the DI and director of the CSC.

Biography
In 1981, Meyer graduated from Whitworth College before being employed at Atlantic Richfield Company (ARCO) in Dallas from November 1981 to December 1985. Meyer then took up a scholarship from the Rotary Club of Dallas to study at Cambridge University, where he earned a Master of Philosophy and Doctor of Philosophy in history and the philosophy of science in 1991. His dissertation was entitled "Of Clues and Causes:  A Methodological Interpretation of Origin-of-Life Research".

In Fall 1990 he became an assistant professor of philosophy at Whitworth, where he was promoted to Associate Professor in 1995, and gained tenure in 1996. In Fall 2002 he moved to the position of professor, Conceptual Foundations of Science, at the Christian Palm Beach Atlantic University. He continued there to Spring 2005, then ceased teaching to devote his time to the intelligent design movement.

Work

Creation science
As an undergraduate, Meyer had been "quite comfortable accepting the standard evolutionary story, although I put a bit of a theistic spin on it – that (evolution) is how God operated", but during his work with ARCO in Dallas, he was influenced by a conference: "I remember being especially fascinated with the origins debate at this conference. It impressed me to see that scientists who had always accepted the standard evolutionary story were now defending a theistic belief, not on the basis that it makes them feel good or provides some form of subjective contentment, but because the scientific evidence suggests an activity of mind that is beyond nature. I was really taken with this." Charles Thaxton organised the conference held in Dallas on 9–10 February 1985, featuring Antony Flew, and Dean H. Kenyon who spoke on "Going Beyond the Naturalistic Mindset: Origin of Life Studies".

Meyer became part of Thaxton's circle, and joined the debate with two articles published in March 1986: in one, he discussed The Mystery of Life's Origin which Thaxton had recently co-authored, commenting that the book had "done well to intimate that 'we are not alone.' Only revelation can now identify the Who that is with us." The other article discussed the 1981 McLean v. Arkansas and 1985 Aguillard v. Treen district court case rulings that teaching creation science in public schools was unconstitutional as creationism originated in religious conviction, and its reliance on "tenets of faith" implied it was not scientific. Meyer argued that modern scientific method equally relied on "foundational assumptions" based on faith in naturalism, which "assumed all events to be exclusively the result of physical or natural causes", so on the definition used in the court cases "science itself does not qualify as legitimate science". He proposed that "scientists and philosophers" could turn to Biblical presupposition to explain "the ultimate source of human reason, the existence of a real and uniformly ordered universe, and the ability present in a creative and ordered human intellect to know that universe. Both the Old and New Testaments define these relationships such that the presuppositional base necessary to modern science is not only explicable but also meaningful." Meyer's argument on epistemological presuppositions and accusation that evolution is based on an assumption of naturalism became central to the design movement.

At the university of Cambridge in England, he met theology student Mark Labberton. In the Fall of 1987 Labberton introduced Meyer to Phillip E. Johnson who was on a sabbatical at University College London, and having become "obsessed with evolution" had begun writing a book on what he saw as its problems. Meyer says "We walked around Cambridge kicking the pea gravel and talking over all the issues."

An article co-authored by Meyer and Thaxton published on 27 December 1987 asserted that "human rights depend upon the Creator who made man with dignity, not upon the state." They contrasted this with "purely material, scientific" ideas which equated humans to animals, and restated their central thesis that "Only if man is (in fact) a product of special Divine purposes can his claim to distinctive or intrinsic dignity be sustained." The terminology and concepts later featured in the Wedge strategy and theistic realism.

Intelligent design 
After the 1987 Edwards v. Aguillard Supreme Court ruling affirmed the Aguillard v. Treen decision against teaching creation science, Thaxton as academic editor of Of Pandas and People adopted intelligent design wording. Meyer recalls the term coming up at a June 1988 conference in Tacoma organised by Thaxton, who "referred to a theory that the presence of DNA in a living cell is evidence of a designing intelligence." Phillip E. Johnson was drafting a book arguing against naturalism as the basis for evolutionary science, and Meyer brought a copy of the manuscript to the conference. He met Paul A. Nelson who found it exciting to read, and the two collaborated on a joint project. Needing a mathematician, they contacted Dembski in 1991. Thaxton has described Meyer as "kind of like" a Johnny Appleseed, bringing others into the movement.

Meyer became one of a group of prominent young intelligent design (ID) advocates with academic degrees: Mayer, Nelson, Dembski and Jonathan Wells. Meyer participated in the "Ad Hoc Origins Committee" defending Johnson's Darwin on Trial in 1992 or 1993 (in response to Stephen Jay Gould's review of it in the July 1992 issue of Scientific American), while with the Philosophy department at Whitworth College. He was later a participant in the first formal meeting devoted to ID, hosted at Southern Methodist University in 1992.

In December 1993, Bruce Chapman, president and founder of the Discovery Institute, noticed an essay in the Wall Street Journal by Meyer about a dispute when biology lecturer Dean H. Kenyon taught intelligent design in introductory classes. Kenyon had co-authored Of Pandas and People, and in 1993 Meyer had contributed to the teacher's notes for the second edition of Pandas. Meyer was an old friend of Discovery Institute co-founder George Gilder, and over dinner about a year later they formed the idea of a think tank opposed to materialism. In the summer of 1995 Chapman and Meyer met a representative of Howard Ahmanson, Jr. Meyer, who had previously tutored Ahmanson's son in science, recalls being asked "What could you do if you had some financial backing?" He was a co-author of the "Wedge strategy", which put forth the Discovery Institute's manifesto for the intelligent design movement.

In 1999, Meyer with David DeWolf and Mark DeForrest laid out a legal strategy for introducing intelligent design into public schools in their book Intelligent Design in Public School Science Curriculum. Meyer has co-edited Darwinism, Design, and Public Education (Michigan State University Press, 2000) with John Angus Campbell and co-edited Science and Evidence of Design in the Universe (Ignatius Press, 2000) with Michael J. Behe and William A. Dembski. In 2009, his book Signature in the Cell was released and in December of that year.

Meyer has been described as "the person who brought ID (intelligent design) to DI (Discovery Institute)" by historian Edward Larson, who was a fellow at the Discovery Institute prior to it becoming the center of the intelligent design movement. In 2004, the DI helped introduce ID to the Dover Area School District, which resulted in the Kitzmiller v. Dover Area School District case where ID was ruled to be based on religious beliefs rather than scientific evidence. Discussing ID in relation to Dover, on May 6, 2005 Meyer debated Eugenie Scott, on The Big Story with John Gibson. During the debate, Meyer argued that intelligent design is critical of more than just evolutionary mechanisms like natural selection that lead to diversification, but of common descent itself.

Films and debates 
He has appeared on television and in public forums advocating intelligent design. Notably he wrote and appeared in the Discovery Institute's 2002 film Unlocking the Mystery of Life and was interviewed in the 2008 Expelled: No Intelligence Allowed movie. He has also been an active debater such as in April 2006 with Peter Ward, a paleontologist from the University of Washington held an open online discussion on the topic of intelligent design in the Talk of the Times forum in Seattle, WA. Meyer has also debated atheists  Peter Atkins, Eugenie Scott and Michael Shermer.

"Teach the controversy" campaign 
In March 2002, following a presentation to the Ohio State Board of Education, Meyer announced a "teach the controversy" strategy, which falsely claims that the theory of evolution is controversial within scientific circles. The presentation included submission of an annotated bibliography of 44 peer-reviewed scientific articles that he claimed raise significant challenges to key tenets of "Darwinian evolution". In response to this claim, the National Center for Science Education (an organisation that works in collaboration with the National Academy of Sciences, the National Association of Biology Teachers, and the National Science Teachers Association to support the teaching of evolution in public schools) contacted the authors of the 44 papers listed, and 26 of them, representing 34 of the papers, responded. None of the authors considered that their research challenged any of the tenets of the theory of evolution. On March 11, 2002, during a panel discussion on evolution, Meyer publicly told the Ohio Board of Education that the in fact not approved "Santorum Amendment" was part of the No Child Left Behind Act and that the State of Ohio was therefore required to require the teaching of alternative theories of evolution as part of the biology curriculum. The professor of biology Kenneth R. Miller replied that comments and not approved amendments in conference committee reports do not carry the weight of law and that Meyer had misled the board of education in implying that they do.

Article in the Proceedings of the Biological Society of Washington 

On 4 August 2004, an article by Meyer appeared in the peer-reviewed scientific journal, Proceedings of the Biological Society of Washington. On September 7, the publisher of the journal, the Council of the Biological Society of Washington, released a statement retracting the article as not having met its scientific standards and saying that the article had been published at the discretion of the former editor Richard Sternberg "without review by any associate editor". Critics believe that Sternberg's personal and ideological connections to Meyer suggest at least the appearance of a conflict of interest in his approval of Meyer's article.

The journal's reasons for disavowing the article were rebutted by Sternberg, who says the paper underwent the standard peer-review process and that he was encouraged to publish it by a member of the Council of the BSW.

A critical review of the article is available on the Panda's Thumb website. In January 2005, the Discovery Institute posted its response to the critique on their website.

The National Center for Science Education also called "the Meyer paper" pseudoscientific.

Claims of persecution
Meyer claims that those who oppose the essentially unanimous international scientific consensus on evolution are persecuted by the scientific community and prevented from publishing their views. In 2001, he signed the statement A Scientific Dissent from Darwinism, coinciding with the launch of the PBS TV series Evolution, saying in part:

The numbers of scientists who question Darwinism is a minority, but it is growing fast. This is happening in the face of fierce attempts to intimidate and suppress legitimate dissent. Young scientists are threatened with deprivation of tenure. Others have seen a consistent pattern of answering scientific arguments with ad hominem attacks. In particular, the series' attempt to stigmatize all critics – including scientists – as religious "creationists" is an excellent example of viewpoint discrimination.

A wide range of scholarly, science education, and legislative sources have denied, refuted, or off-handedly dismissed these allegations. In a 2006 article published in the Journal of Clinical Investigation, a group of writers that included historian of science Ronald L. Numbers (author of The Creationists), philosopher of biology Elliott Sober, Wisconsin State Assembly representative Terese Berceau, and four members of the Department of Biochemistry at the University of Wisconsin–Madison characterized such claims as being a hoax. On their website refuting the claims in the film Expelled (which featured Meyer), the National Center for Science Education states that "Intelligent design advocates ... have no research and no evidence, and have repeatedly shown themselves unwilling to formulate testable hypotheses; yet they complain about an imagined exclusion, even after having flunked the basics." In analysing an Academic Freedom bill that was based upon a Discovery Institute model statute, the Florida Senate found that "According to the Department of Education, there has never been a case in Florida where a public school teacher or public school student has claimed that they have been discriminated against based on their science teaching or science course work."

Signature in the Cell 

On June 23, 2009, HarperOne released Meyer's Signature in the Cell: DNA and the Evidence for Intelligent Design. The philosopher Thomas Nagel, who generally argues in opposition to the philosophical position of physicalist reductionism specifically and materialism more generally, submitted the book as his contribution to the "2009 Books of the Year" supplement for The Times, writing "Signature in the Cell...is a detailed account of the problem of how life came into existence from lifeless matter – something that had to happen before the process of biological evolution could begin ... Meyer is a Christian, but atheists, and theists who believe God never intervenes in the natural world, will be instructed by his careful presentation of this fiendishly difficult problem."

Stephen Fletcher, chemist at Loughborough University, responded in The Times Literary Supplement that  Nagel was  "promot[ing] the book to the rest of us using statements that are factually incorrect." Fletcher explained "Natural selection is in fact a chemical process as well as a biological process, and it was operating for about half a billion years before the earliest cellular life forms appear in the fossil record." In another publication, Fletcher wrote: "I am afraid that reality has overtaken Meyer's book and its flawed reasoning", pointing out scientific problems with Meyer's work by citing how RNA "survived and evolved into our own human protein-making factory, and continues to make our fingers and toes."

Darrel Falk,  former president of the BioLogos Foundation and a biology professor at Point Loma Nazarene University, reviewed the book, saying it illustrates why he does not support the intelligent design movement. Falk is critical of Meyer's declaration of scientists being wrong, such as Michael Lynch about genetic drift, without Meyer having done any experiment or calculation to disprove Lynch's assertion. Falk writes, "the book is supposed to be a science book and the ID movement is purported to be primarily a scientific movementnot primarily a philosophical, religious, or even popular movement", but concludes "If the object of the book is to show that the Intelligent Design movement is a scientific movement, it has not succeeded. In fact, what it has succeeded in showing is that it is a popular movement grounded primarily in the hopes and dreams of those in philosophy, in religion, and especially those in the general public."

Darwin's Doubt
On 18 June 2013, HarperOne released Darwin's Doubt: The Explosive Origin of Animal Life and the Case for Intelligent Design. In this book, Meyer proposed that the Cambrian explosion contradicts Darwin's evolutionary process and is best explained by intelligent design.

In a review published by The Skeptics Society titled "Stephen Meyer's Fumbling Bumbling Amateur Cambrian Follies", paleontologist Donald Prothero gave a highly negative review of Meyer's book. Prothero pointed out that the "Cambrian Explosion" concept itself has been deemed an outdated concept after recent decades of fossil discovery and he points out that 'Cambrian diversification' is a more consensual term now used in paleontology to describe the 80 million-year time frame where the fossil record shows the gradual and stepwise evolution of more and more complicated animal life.  Prothero criticizes Meyer for ignoring much of the fossil record and instead focusing on a later stage to give the impression that all Cambrian life forms appeared abruptly without predecessors. In contrast, Prothero cites paleontologist BS Lieberman that the rates of evolution during the 'Cambrian explosion' were typical of any adaptive radiation in life's history.  He quotes another prominent paleontologist Andrew Knoll that '20 million years is a long time for organisms that produce a new generation every year or two' without the need to invoke any unknown processes. Going through a list of topics in modern evolutionary biology Meyer used to bolster his idea in the book, Prothero asserts that Meyer, not a paleontologist nor a molecular biologist, does not understand these scientific disciplines, therefore he misinterprets, distorts and confuses the data, all for the purpose of promoting the 'God of the gaps' argument: 'anything that is currently not easily explained by science is automatically attributed to supernatural causes', i.e. intelligent design.

In his article "Doubting 'Darwin's Doubt'" published in The New Yorker, Gareth Cook says that this book is another attempt by the creationist to rekindle the intelligent design movement. Decades of fossil discovery around the world, aided by new computational analytical techniques enable scientists to construct a more complete portrait of the tree of life which was not available to Darwin (hence his "doubt" in Meyer's words). The contemporary scientific consensus is that there was no "explosion". Cook cites Nick Matzke's analysis that the major gaps identified by Meyer are derived from his lack of understanding of the field's key statistical techniques (among other things) and his misleading rearrangement of the tree of life. Cook references scientific literature to refute Meyer's argument that the genetic machinery of life is incapable of big leaps therefore any major biological advancement must be the result of intervention by the 'intelligent designer'.  Like Prothero, Cook also criticizes Meyer's proposal that if something cannot be fully explained by today's science, it must be the work of a supreme deity.  Calling it a 'masterwork of pseudoscience', Cook warns that the influence of this book should not be underestimated.  Cook opines that the book, with Meyer sewing skillfully together the trappings of science, wielding his credential of a PhD (in history of science) from the University of Cambridge, writing in a seemingly serious and reasonable manner, will appeal to a large audience who is hungry for material evidence of God or considers science a conspiracy against spirituality.

From a different perspective, paleontologist Charles Marshall wrote in his review "When Prior Belief Trumps Scholarship" published in Science that while trying to build the scientific case for intelligent design, Meyer allows his deep belief to steer his understanding and interpretation of the scientific data and fossil records collected for the Cambrian period. The result (this book) is selective knowledge (scholarship) that is plagued with misrepresentation, omission, and dismissal of the scientific consensus; exacerbated by Meyer's lack of scientific knowledge and superficial understanding in the relevant fields, especially molecular phylogenetics and morphogenesis. The main argument of Meyer is the mathematically impossible time scale that is needed to support emergence of new genes which drive the explosion of new species during the Cambrian period. Marshall points out that the relatively fast appearance of new animal species in this period is not driven by new genes, but rather by evolving from existing genes through "rewiring" of the gene regulatory networks (GRNs). This basis of morphogenesis is dismissed by Meyer due to his fixation on novel genes and new protein folds as prerequisite of emergence of new species. The root of his bias is his "God of the gaps" approach to knowledge and the sentimental quest to "provide solace to those who feel their faith undermined by secular society and by science in particular".

Bibliography

Footnotes

Sources
 

  (also pdf)

External links 
 
 Stephen Meyer at the Discovery Institute
 
 Darwin's Doubt homepage

Discovery Institute fellows and advisors
Intelligent design advocates
Living people
People from Spokane, Washington

1958 births
Alumni of the University of Cambridge
Critics of atheism
Whitworth University alumni
Whitworth University faculty